Tianzhou 5 is the fifth mission of the Tianzhou-class unmanned cargo spacecraft, and the fourth resupply mission to the Tiangong Space Station. Like previous Tianzhou missions, the spacecraft was launched from the Wenchang Satellite Launch Center in Hainan, China on a Long March 7 rocket. It was successfully placed into orbit on 12 November and docked to the Tiangong space station on the same day. The rendezvous and docking process lasted 2 hours and 7 minutes, setting a world record for the fastest rendezvous and docking between a spacecraft and a space station, surpassing Soyuz MS-17's 3 hours and 3 minutes.

Spacecraft 

The Tianzhou cargo spacecraft has several notable differences with the Tiangong-1 from which it is derived. It has only three segments of solar panels (against 4 for Tiangong), but has 4 maneuvering engines (against 2 for Tiangong).

References 

Tiangong program
Tianzhou (spacecraft)
2022 in China
Spacecraft launched in 2022